Shera is a 1999 Indian Hindi-language action film directed by T. L. V. Prasad and produced by Rajiv Babbar, starring Mithun Chakraborty, Vineetha, Rami Reddy and Gulshan Grover.

Plot
A Building contractor Jai Khurana (Mithun Chakraborty), is married to Police Inspector Shivani (Vineetha) and lives a happy life. Jai's sister, Jyoti's college, is overrun by drugs, and Shivani takes charge to control the menace. She arrests drug Mafia don Balloo Bakra's (Rami Reddy) brother K.D., which leads to disturbance in the life of Jai. Jai becomes an eyewitness in a murder case and is set to testify against dangerous gang leader VCR's two sons. But Jai backs off when VCR kidnaps Jyoti and blackmails Jai to back off. Things take a violent turn when Jyoti is murdered, and Jai transforms into Shera; the violent alter ego from his past. Shera wages a war on the Drug Mafias and takes the help of Chandola (Gulshan Grover), who was victimized by drugs. Meanwhile; the city faces a gang war between Bakra and VCR. Shera rages in action to annihilate the crime world, but faces one last betrayal in his mission. Muna and Tuna also henchmen of Chandola.

Shera kills one of the son of VCR and also starts killing his gang members one by one.Now VCR tries to teach a lesson. Shivani was admitted at hospital and who was taking treatment. VCR kidnaps her and blackmails Shera. Shera defeats everyone and succeeded to kill the VCR and saves Shivani. After that Shera surrender himself to police and he was sentenced for age limit prison but the crime which was done by him was for a good reason so he was sentenced for 5 years.

Cast
Mithun Chakraborty as Jai Khurana a.k.a. Shera
Vineetha as Police Inspector Shivani 
Gulshan Grover as Blackie, an  underworld don a.k.a. Chandola
Rami Reddy as Balloo Bakra
Deepak Shirke as VCR
Shehzad Khan as Munna
Gavin Packard as Brownie The Bastard
Jaya Bhattacharya as Jyoti
Asrani as Police inspector
Hemant Ravan as Vishal
Kasam Ali as KD
Ashwin Kaushal as Tuna
Pushpa Verma
Shoiab Khan as Shankie
Twinkle Singh as Nyehyong
Vinod Panchal as Kishen
Bob Christo as Daniel d'Costa

Music
The music was given by Anand–Milind and the lyrics were written by Dev Kohli some of the songs were topped at that time

References

External links

 T.L.V. Prasad, Film Director

1999 films
1990s Hindi-language films
1990s action films
Mithun's Dream Factory films
Films shot in Ooty
Films scored by Anand–Milind
Indian martial arts films
1999 martial arts films
Films directed by T. L. V. Prasad